The Captain Daniel Bradford House is a historic house in Duxbury, Massachusetts.  The -story wood-frame house was built in 1808 by Captaian Daniel Bradford, on land belonging to his father, Colonel Gamaliel Bradford.  It is five bays wide and three deep, with a hip roof and large central chimney.  The front entry is flanked by sidelight windows and pilasters, above which are a fanlight and a gable.  A two-story ell is attached to the right side of the house.

The house was listed on the National Register of Historic Places in 1986.

See also
Capt. Gamaliel Bradford House
National Register of Historic Places listings in Plymouth County, Massachusetts

References

Houses completed in 1808
Houses in Duxbury, Massachusetts
National Register of Historic Places in Plymouth County, Massachusetts
Houses on the National Register of Historic Places in Plymouth County, Massachusetts
Federal architecture in Massachusetts